Marine geology or geological oceanography is the study of the history and structure of the ocean floor. It involves geophysical, geochemical, sedimentological and paleontological investigations of the ocean floor and coastal zone. Marine geology has strong ties to geophysics and to physical oceanography.

Marine geological studies were of extreme importance in providing the critical evidence for sea floor spreading and plate tectonics in the years following World War II. The deep ocean floor is the last essentially unexplored frontier and detailed mapping in support of both military (submarine) objectives and economic (petroleum and metal mining) objectives drives the research.–

Overview

The Ring of Fire around the Pacific Ocean with its attendant intense volcanism and seismic activity poses a major threat for disastrous earthquakes, tsunamis and volcanic eruptions. Any early warning systems for these disastrous events will require a more detailed understanding of marine geology of coastal and island arc environments.

The study of littoral and deep sea sedimentation and the precipitation and dissolution rates of calcium carbonate in various marine environments has important implications for global climate change.

The discovery and continued study of mid-ocean rift zone volcanism and hydrothermal vents, first in the Red Sea and later along the East Pacific Rise and the Mid-Atlantic Ridge systems were and continue to be important areas of marine geological research. The extremophile organisms discovered living within and adjacent to those hydrothermal systems have had a pronounced impact on our understanding of life on Earth and potentially the origin of life within such an environment.

Oceanic trenches are hemispheric-scale long but narrow topographic depressions of the sea floor. They also are the deepest parts of the ocean floor.

Mariana Trench 
The Mariana Trench (or Marianas Trench) is the deepest known submarine trench, and the deepest location in the Earth's crust itself. It is a subduction zone where the Pacific Plate is being subducted under the Mariana Plate. The bottom of the trench is further below sea level than Mount Everest is above sea level.

See also 

 Bathymetric chart
 Hawaiian-Emperor seamount chain
 Hydrogeology
 List of geologists
 Pelagic sediments
 Seafloor mapping

References

Sources

 Erickson, Jon, 1996, Marine Geology: Undersea Landforms and Life Forms, Facts on File 
 "What is the Ring of Fire? : Ocean Exploration Facts: NOAA Office of Ocean Exploration and Research". oceanexplorer.noaa.gov. Retrieved 2023-02-10.
 Atwood, Trisha B.; Witt, Andrew; Mayorga, Juan; Hammill, Edd; Sala, Enric (2020). "Global Patterns in Marine Sediment Carbon Stocks". Frontiers in Marine Science. 7. doi:10.3389/fmars.2020.00165/full. ISSN 2296-7745.
 Merino, Nancy; Aronson, Heidi S.; Bojanova, Diana P.; Feyhl-Buska, Jayme; Wong, Michael L.; Zhang, Shu; Giovannelli, Donato (2019). "Living at the Extremes: Extremophiles and the Limits of Life in a Planetary Context". Frontiers in Microbiology. 10. doi:10.3389/fmicb.2019.00780/full. ISSN 1664-302X.

External links
 Soundwaves Coastal Science & Research News from Across the USGS
 Marine Geology and Geophysics - NOAA
 Pacific Seafloor Mapping Project - USGS
 Marine Geology and Geophysics at MIT
 Ocean Drilling Program

 
Oceanography
Subfields of geology